The 1948–49 BAA season was the first season for the Fort Wayne Pistons in the NBA/BAA and eighth season as a franchise. 

Despite their NBL success which included four championship series births and two titles the team wasn't able to translate that success to the new league and missed the playoffs for the first time in team history.  The team was led by center John Mahnken (9.5 ppg) and forward Blackie Towery (7.5 ppg).

Draft picks

Roster

Regular season

Season standings

Record vs. opponents

Game log

References

Detroit Pistons seasons
Fort Wayne